RADT  may refer to:
Rapid strep test
Rapid Application Development Tool

Radt may refer to:
Raadt, a surname, such as with Theo de Raadt

Radt may refer to:
Royal Albert Dock Trust, also found at London Regatta Centre